Adelphogamy is a form of sexual partnership between sibling eukaryotes, especially in some species of fungi, flowering plants or ants, or in humans. In flowering plants, adelphogamy refers to sibling pollination: pollen and stigma belong to two individuals which derives from same mother plant.

In sociology, the term adelphogamy or adelphic polyandry may also refer to fraternal polyandry, or to an incestuous relationship between a brother and sister.

See also 

 Incest between twins
 List of coupled siblings

References

External links
 

Reproduction
Incest